Filociclovir (cyclopropavir, MBX-400) is an antiviral drug which was developed for the treatment of cytomegalovirus infection and also shows some activity against other double-stranded DNA viruses. It has reached Phase II human clinical trials.

References 

Antiviral drugs